Sorivudine (INN), is a nucleoside analogue antiviral drug, marketed under trade names such as Usevir (Nippon Shoji, Eisai) and Brovavir (BMS).  It is used for the treatment of varicella zoster virus infections.

Pharmacology

Feature
 First-line treatment of herpes drug acyclovir was (Zovirax, Activir) from VZV strong activity of the virus.
 Undergoes gastrointestinal absorption, absorption from the gastrointestinal tract after the most degrading without being excreted in urine.

Mechanism of action
 Sorivudine is phosphorylated by thymidine kinase activity in the body and is absorbed into the virus's DNA instead of the correct nucleoside.  It is a competitive inhibitor of DNA polymerase, so the viral DNA cannot be replicated and the virus cannot grow.

Microbiology
Sorivudine is active against most species in the herpesvirus family.
 Herpes simplex virus type I (HSV-1)
 Varicella zoster virus (VZV)
 Epstein–Barr virus (EBV)

Interactions

Sorivudine interacts strongly and in some cases lethally with fluorouracil (5-FU), its prodrugs and related substances. This is based on the metabolite bromovinyluracil (BVU), which irreversibly inhibits the enzyme dihydropyrimidine dehydrogenase (DPD) which is necessary for inactivating 5-FU. The closely related drug brivudine has the same interaction.

References

Pyrimidinediones
Anti-herpes virus drugs
Arabinosides
Hydroxymethyl compounds